Stephen Marro is a film director, writer, producer based in New York. He is best known for being the  producer and director of the 2012 feature film, Broadway's Finest.

Early life and education
Marro grew up in Long Beach, New York and later received his BA in film from New York University.

References

External links
 

Living people
Film directors from New York City
Film producers from New York (state)
American male screenwriters
American directors
Screenwriters from New York (state)
Year of birth missing (living people)